John Constable  (11 June 1776 – 31 March 1837) was an English landscape painter in the Romantic tradition. Born in Suffolk, he is known principally for revolutionising the genre of landscape painting with his pictures of Dedham Vale, the area surrounding his home – now known as "Constable Country" – which he invested with an intensity of affection. "I should paint my own places best", he wrote to his friend John Fisher in 1821, "painting is but another word for feeling".

Constable's most famous paintings include Wivenhoe Park (1816), Dedham Vale (1821) and The Hay Wain (1821). Although his paintings are now among the most popular and valuable in British art, he was never financially successful. He became a member of the establishment after he was elected to the Royal Academy of Arts at the age of 52. His work was embraced in France, where he sold more than in his native England and inspired the Barbizon school.

Early career 

John Constable was born in East Bergholt, a village on the River Stour in Suffolk, to Golding and Ann (Watts) Constable. His father was a wealthy corn merchant, owner of Flatford Mill in East Bergholt and, later, Dedham Mill in Essex. Golding Constable owned a small ship, The Telegraph, which he moored at Mistley on the Stour estuary, and used to transport corn to London. He was a cousin of the London tea merchant, Abram Newman. Although Constable was his parents' second son, his older brother was intellectually disabled and John was expected to succeed his father in the business. After a brief period at a boarding school in Lavenham, he was enrolled in a day school in Dedham, Essex. Constable worked in the corn business after leaving school, but his younger brother Abram eventually took over the running of the mills.

In his youth, Constable embarked on amateur sketching trips in the surrounding Suffolk and Essex countryside, which was to become the subject of a large proportion of his art.  These scenes, in his own words, "made me a painter, and I am grateful"; "the sound of water escaping from mill dams etc., willows, old rotten planks, slimy posts, and brickwork, I love such things." He was introduced to George Beaumont, a collector, who showed him his prized Hagar and the Angel by Claude Lorrain, which inspired Constable. Later, while visiting relatives in Middlesex, he was introduced to the professional artist John Thomas Smith, who advised him on painting but also urged him to remain in his father's business rather than take up art professionally.

In 1799, Constable persuaded his father to let him pursue a career in art, and Golding granted him a small allowance. Entering the Royal Academy Schools as a probationer, he attended life classes and anatomical dissections, and studied and copied old masters. Among works that particularly inspired him during this period were paintings by Thomas Gainsborough, Claude Lorrain, Peter Paul Rubens, Annibale Carracci and Jacob van Ruisdael.  He also read widely among poetry and sermons, and later proved a notably articulate artist.

In 1802 he refused the position of drawing master at Great Marlow Military College (now Sandhurst), a move which Benjamin West (then master of the RA) counselled would mean the end of his career. In that year, Constable wrote a letter to John Dunthorne in which he spelled out his determination to become a professional landscape painter:

His early style has many qualities associated with his mature work, including a freshness of light, colour and touch, and reveals the compositional influence of the old masters he had studied, notably of Claude Lorrain. Constable's usual subjects, scenes of ordinary daily life, were unfashionable in an age that looked for more romantic visions of wild landscapes and ruins. He made occasional trips farther afield.

By 1803, he was exhibiting paintings at the Royal Academy. In April he spent almost a month aboard the East Indiaman  as it visited south-east ports while sailing from London to Deal before leaving for China.

In 1806 Constable undertook a two-month tour of the Lake District. He told his friend and biographer, Charles Leslie, that the solitude of the mountains oppressed his spirits, and Leslie wrote:

Constable adopted a routine of spending winter in London and painting at East Bergholt in summer. In 1811 he first visited John Fisher and his family in Salisbury, a city whose cathedral and surrounding landscape were to inspire some of his greatest paintings.

To make ends meet, Constable took up portraiture, which he found dull, though he executed many fine portraits. He also painted occasional religious pictures but, according to John Walker, "Constable's incapacity as a religious painter cannot be overstated."

Another source of income was country house painting. In 1816, he was commissioned by Major-General Francis Slater-Rebow to paint his country home, Wivenhoe Park, Essex. The Major-General also commissioned a smaller painting of the fishing lodge in the grounds of Alresford Hall, which is now in the National Gallery of Victoria. Constable used the money from these commissions towards his wedding with Maria Bicknell.

Marriage 

From 1809, his childhood friendship with Maria Elizabeth Bicknell developed into a deep, mutual love. Their marriage in 1816 when Constable was 40 was opposed by Maria's grandfather, Dr Rhudde, rector of East Bergholt. He considered the Constables his social inferiors and threatened Maria with disinheritance. Maria's father, Charles Bicknell, solicitor to George IV and the Admiralty, was reluctant to see Maria throw away her inheritance. Maria pointed out to John that a penniless marriage would detract from any chances he had of making a career in painting. Golding and Ann Constable, while approving the match, held out no prospect of supporting the marriage until Constable was financially secure. After they died in quick succession, Constable inherited a fifth share in the family business.

John and Maria's marriage in October 1816 at St Martin-in-the-Fields (with Fisher officiating) was followed by time at Fisher's vicarage and a honeymoon tour of the south coast. The sea at Weymouth and Brighton stimulated Constable to develop new techniques of brilliant colour and vivacious brushwork. At the same time, a greater emotional range began to be expressed in his art.

Three weeks before their marriage, Constable revealed that he had started work on his most ambitious project to date In a letter to Maria Bicknell from East Bergholt, he wrote:

The picture was Flatford Mill (Scene on a Navigable River). It was the largest canvas of a working scene on the River Stour that he had worked on to date and the largest he would ever complete largely outdoors. Constable was determined to paint on a larger scale, his objective not only to attract more attention at the Royal Academy exhibitions but also, it seems, to project his ideas about landscape on a scale more in keeping with the achievements of the classical landscape painters he so admired. Although Flatford Mill failed to find a buyer when it was exhibited at the Royal Academy in 1817, its fine and intricate execution drew much praise, encouraging Constable to move on to the even larger canvases that were to follow.

The ‘Six-Footers’ 

Although he managed to scrape an income from painting, it was not until 1819 that Constable sold his first important canvas, The White Horse, described by Charles Robert Leslie as ‘on many accounts the most important picture Constable ever painted'''. The painting (without the frame) sold for the substantial price of 100 guineas to his friend John Fisher, finally providing Constable with a level of financial freedom he had never before known. The White Horse marked an important turning point in Constable’s career; its success saw him elected an associate of the Royal Academy and it led to a series of six monumental landscapes depicting narratives on the River Stour known as the ‘six-footers’ (named for their scale). Viewed as ‘the knottiest and most forceful landscapes produced in 19th-century Europe’, for many they are the defining works of the artist's career. The series also includes Stratford Mill, 1820 (National Gallery, London); The Hay Wain, 1821 (National Gallery, London); View on the Stour near Dedham, 1822 (Huntington Library and Art Gallery, Los Angeles County); The Lock, 1824 (Private Collection); and The Leaping Horse, 1825 (Royal Academy of Arts, London).

The following year, his second six-footer Stratford Mill was exhibited. The Examiner described it as having ‘a more exact look of nature than any picture we have ever seen by an Englishman’. The painting was a success, acquiring a buyer in the loyal John Fisher, who purchased it for  100 guineas, a price he himself thought too low. Fisher bought the painting for his solicitor and friend, John Pern Tinney. Tinney loved the painting so much, he offered Constable another 100 guineas to paint a companion picture, an offer the artist didn’t take up.

In 1821, his most famous painting The Hay Wain was shown at the Royal Academy's exhibition. Although it failed to find a buyer, It was viewed by some important people of the time, including two Frenchmen, the artist Théodore Géricault and writer Charles Nodier. According to the painter Eugène Delacroix, Géricault returned to France ’quite stunned‘ by Constable’s painting, while Nodier suggested French artists should also look to nature rather than relying on trips to Rome for inspiration. It was eventually purchased, along with View on the Stour near Dedham, by the Anglo-French dealer John Arrowsmith, in 1824. A small painting of Yarmouth Jetty was added to the bargain by Constable, with the sale totalling £250. Both paintings were exhibited at the Paris Salon that year, where they caused a sensation, with the Hay Wain being awarded a gold medal by Charles X. The Hay Wain was later acquired by the collector Henry Vaughan who donated it to the National Gallery in 1886.

Of Constable's colour, Delacroix wrote in his journal: "What he says here about the green of his meadows can be applied to every tone". Delacroix repainted the background of his 1824 Massacre de Scio after seeing the Constables at Arrowsmith's Gallery, which he said had done him a great deal of good.

A number of distractions meant that The Lock wasn't finished in time for the 1823 exhibition, leaving the much smaller Salisbury Cathedral from the Bishop's Grounds as the artist's main entry. This may have occurred after Fisher forwarded Constable the money for the painting. This both helped him out of a financial difficulty and nudged him along to get the painting done. The Lock was therefore exhibited the following year to more fanfare and sold for 150 guineas on the first day of the exhibition, the only Constable ever to do so. The Lock is the only upright landscape of the Stour series and the only six-footer that Constable painted more than one version of. A second version now known as the ‘Foster version’ was painted in 1825 and kept by the artist to send to exhibitions. A third, landscape version, known as ‘A Boat Passing a Lock’ (1826) is now in the collection of the Royal Academy of Arts. Constable’s final attempt, The Leaping Horse, was the only six-footer from the Stour series that didn’t sell in Constable’s lifetime.

 Later life 

Constable’s pleasure at his own success was dampened after his wife started displaying symptoms of tuberculosis. Her growing illness meant that Constable took lodgings for his family in Brighton from 1824 until 1828, in the hope the sea air could restore her health. During this period Constable split his time between Charlotte Street in London and Brighton. This change saw Constable move away from large scale Stour scenes in favour of coastal scenes. He continued painting six-foot canvases, although he was initially unsure of the suitability of Brighton as a subject for painting. In a letter to Fisher in 1824 he wrote

In his lifetime, Constable sold only 20 paintings in England, but in France he sold more than 20 in just a few years. Despite this, he refused all invitations to travel internationally to promote his work, writing to Francis Darby: "I would rather be a poor man [in England] than a rich man abroad."
In 1825, perhaps due partly to the worry of his wife's ill-health, the uncongeniality of living in Brighton ("Piccadilly by the seaside"), and the pressure of numerous outstanding commissions, he quarreled with Arrowsmith and lost his French outlet.Chain Pier, Brighton was his only ambitious six-foot painting of a Brighton subject, it was exhibited in 1827. The Constables persevered in Brighton for five years to aid Maria’s health, but to no avail. After the birth of their seventh child in January 1828, they returned to Hampstead where Maria died on 23 November at the age of 41. Intensely saddened, Constable wrote to his brother Golding, "hourly do I feel the loss of my departed Angel—God only knows how my children will be brought up...the face of the World is totally changed to me".

Thereafter, he dressed in black and was, according to Leslie, "a prey to melancholy and anxious thoughts". He cared for his seven children alone for the rest of his life. The children were John Charles, Maria Louisa, Charles Golding, Isobel, Emma, Alfred, and Lionel. Only Charles Golding Constable produced offspring.

Shortly before Maria died, her father had also died, leaving her £20,000. Constable speculated disastrously with the money, paying for the engraving of several mezzotints of some of his landscapes in preparation for a publication. He was hesitant and indecisive, nearly fell out with his engraver, and when the folios were published, could not interest enough subscribers. Constable collaborated closely with mezzotinter David Lucas on 40 prints after his landscapes, one of which went through 13 proof stages, corrected by Constable in pencil and paint. Constable said, "Lucas showed me to the public without my faults", but the venture was not a financial success.

This period saw his art move from the serenity of its earlier phase, to a more broken and accented style. The turmoil and distress of his mind is clearly seen in his later six-foot masterpieces Hadleigh Castle (1829) and Salisbury Cathedral from the Meadows (1831), which are amongst his most expressive pieces.

He was elected to the Royal Academy in February 1829, at the age of 52. In 1831 he was appointed Visitor at the Royal Academy, where he seems to have been popular with the students.

He began to deliver public lectures on the history of landscape painting, which were attended by distinguished audiences. In a series of lectures at the Royal Institution, Constable proposed a three-fold thesis: firstly, landscape painting is scientific as well as poetic; secondly, the imagination cannot alone produce art to bear comparison with reality; and thirdly, no great painter was ever self-taught.

He also spoke against the new Gothic Revival movement, which he considered mere "imitation".

In 1835, his last lecture to students of the Royal Academy, in which he praised Raphael and called the Academy the "cradle of British art", was "cheered most heartily". He died on the night of 31 March 1837, apparently from heart failure, and was buried with Maria in the graveyard of St John-at-Hampstead Church in Hampstead in London. (His children John Charles Constable and Charles Golding Constable are also buried in this family tomb.)

 Locations 
Bridge Cottage is a National Trust property, open to the public. Nearby Flatford Mill and Willy Lott's Cottage (the house visible in The Hay Wain) are used by the Field Studies Council for courses. The largest collection of original Constable paintings outside London is on display at Christchurch Mansion in Ipswich. Somerville College, Oxford is in possession of a portrait by Constable.

 Art 

Constable quietly rebelled against the artistic culture that taught artists to use their imagination to compose their pictures rather than nature itself. He told Leslie, "When I sit down to make a sketch from nature, the first thing I try to do is to forget that I have ever seen a picture".

Constable attributed his gift 'to all that lay on the Stour river', however, biographer Anthony Bailey attributed his artistic development to the influence of his well to do relative, Thomas Allen and the London contacts he introduced Constable to.

Although Constable produced paintings throughout his life for the "finished" picture market of patrons and R.A. exhibitions, constant refreshment in the form of on-the-spot studies was essential to his working method. He was never satisfied with following a formula. "The world is wide", he wrote, "no two days are alike, nor even two hours; neither were there ever two leaves of a tree alike since the creation of all the world; and the genuine productions of art, like those of nature, are all distinct from each other."

Constable painted many full-scale preliminary sketches of his landscapes to test the composition in advance of finished pictures. These large sketches, with their free and vigorous brushwork, were revolutionary at the time, and they continue to interest artists, scholars and the general public. The oil sketches of The Leaping Horse and The Hay Wain, for example, convey a vigour and expressiveness missing from Constable's finished paintings of the same subjects. Possibly more than any other aspect of Constable's work, the oil sketches reveal him in retrospect to have been an avant-garde painter, one who demonstrated that landscape painting could be taken in a totally new direction.

Constable's watercolours were also remarkably free for their time: the almost mystical Stonehenge, 1835, with its double rainbow, is often considered to be one of the greatest watercolours ever painted. When he exhibited it in 1836, Constable appended a text to the title: "The mysterious monument of Stonehenge, standing remote on a bare and boundless heath, as much unconnected with the events of past ages as it is with the uses of the present, carries you back beyond all historical records into the obscurity of a totally unknown period."

In addition to the full-scale oil sketches, Constable completed numerous observational studies of landscapes and clouds, determined to become more scientific in his recording of atmospheric conditions. The power of his physical effects was sometimes apparent even in the full-scale paintings which he exhibited in London; The Chain Pier, 1827, for example, prompted a critic to write: "the atmosphere possesses a characteristic humidity about it, that almost imparts the wish for an umbrella".

The sketches themselves were the first ever done in oils directly from the subject in the open air, with the notable exception of the oil sketches Pierre-Henri de Valenciennes made in Rome around 1780. To convey the effects of light and movement, Constable used broken brushstrokes, often in small touches, which he scumbled over lighter passages, creating an impression of sparkling light enveloping the entire landscape. One of the most expressionistic and powerful of all his studies is Seascape Study with Rain Cloud, painted about 1824 at Brighton, which captures with slashing dark brushstrokes the immediacy of an exploding cumulus shower at sea. Constable also became interested in painting rainbow effects, for example in Salisbury Cathedral from the Meadows, 1831, and in Cottage at East Bergholt, 1833.

To the sky studies he added notes, often on the back of the sketches, of the prevailing weather conditions, direction of light, and time of day, believing that the sky was "the key note, the standard of scale, and the chief organ of sentiment" in a landscape painting. In this habit he is known to have been influenced by the pioneering work of the meteorologist Luke Howard on the classification of clouds; Constable's annotations of his own copy of Researches About Atmospheric Phaenomena by Thomas Forster show him to have been fully abreast of meteorological terminology. "I have done a good deal of skying", Constable wrote to Fisher on 23 October 1821; "I am determined to conquer all difficulties, and that most arduous one among the rest".

Constable once wrote in a letter to Leslie, "My limited and abstracted art is to be found under every hedge, and in every lane, and therefore nobody thinks it worth picking up". He could never have imagined how influential his honest techniques would turn out to be. Constable's art inspired not only contemporaries like Géricault and Delacroix, but the Barbizon School, and the French impressionists of the late nineteenth century.

In 2019 two drawings by Constable were unearthed in a dusty cardboard-box filled with drawings; the drawings sold for £60,000 and £32,000 at auction.

 Gallery 

 Selected paintings 

 Dedham Vale (1802) – Victoria and Albert Museum, LondonThe Stour (1810) – Philadelphia Museum of Art
 Landscape: Two Boys Fishing (1813) – Anglesey Abbey, Cambs, NT
 Landscape: Ploughing Scene in Suffolk (1814, revised c. 1816 and 1831) – Yale Center for British Art, New Haven
  The Mill Stream, Flatford (1814) – Christchurch Mansion, IpswichThe Stour Valley And Dedham Village (1814–1815) – Museum of Fine Arts, Boston
 Boat-building near Flatford Mill (1815) – Victoria and Albert Museum, London
 Golding Constable's Flower Garden (1815) – Christchurch Mansion, Ipswich
 Golding Constable's Kitchen Garden (1815) – Christchurch Mansion, Ipswich
 Portrait of Maria Bicknell, Mrs. John Constable (1816) – Tate Britain, London
 Wivenhoe Park, Essex (1816) – National Gallery of Art, Washington, D.C.
 The Quarters behind Alresford Hall (1816) – National Gallery of Victoria, Melbourne
 Flatford Mill (original title Scene on a Navigable River) (1816) – Tate Britain, LondonTwo Donkeys (1816) – Philadelphia Museum of Art
 Weymouth Bay: Bowleaze Cove and Jordon Hill (1816–17) – National Gallery, London
 A Cottage in a Cornfield (1817) – National Museum Cardiff 
 Weymouth Bay with Approaching Storm (1819) – Louvre, Paris
 The White Horse (A Scene on the River Stour) (1819) – Frick Collection, New York City
 Harwich- The Low Lighthouse and Beacon Hill (1820) – Yale Center for British Art, New Haven
 Hampstead Heath (1820) – Fitzwilliam Museum, Cambridge
 Dedham Lock and Mill (1820) – Victoria and Albert Museum, London
 Stratford Mill (1820) – National Gallery, London
 The Hay Wain (original title Landscape: Noon; 1821) – National Gallery, London
 The Grove, or the Admiral's House in Hampstead (1821–22) – Alte Nationalgalerie, Berlin
 View on the Stour near Dedham (1822) – The Huntington Library, San Marino, CA
 Salisbury Cathedral from the Bishop's Grounds (1823) – Victoria and Albert Museum, LondonThe Lock (1824) – Private Collection 
 Seascape Study with Rain Clouds (1824–25) – Royal Academy of Arts, London
 Brighton Beach (c. 1824–26) – Dunedin Public Art Gallery, Dunedin
 The Leaping Horse (1825) – Royal Academy of Arts, London
 Salisbury Cathedral from the Bishop's Grounds (1825) – Frick Collection, New York City
 The Cornfield (1826) – National Gallery, London
 Chain Pier, Brighton (1826) – Tate Britain, London 
 The Vale of Dedham (1828) – National Gallery of Scotland, Edinburgh
 Hadleigh Castle (1829) – Yale Center for British Art and sketch Tate Britain
 Salisbury Cathedral from the Meadows (1831) – Tate Britain, London
 The Opening of Waterloo Bridge seen from Whitehall Stairs, 18 June 1817 (c.1832) – Tate Britain, London
 The Valley Farm (1835) – Tate Britain, London 
 Stonehenge (1835) – Victoria and Albert Museum, London
 Hampstead Heath with a Rainbow (1836) – Tate Britain, London
 Cenotaph to the Memory of Sir Joshua Reynolds (1836) – National Gallery, London
 Arundel Mill and Castle'' (c. 1836–37) – Toledo Museum of Art, Toledo, OH

Notes

Bibliography 

 
 
 
 
 
 
 
 
 
 
  Kindle

External links 

 
 John Constable: Sketch for Hadleigh Castle c1828 – Great Works of Western Art
 A gallery of Constable's cloud studies
 Web feature from Royal Academy of Arts
 Constable's Great Landscapes: The Six-Foot Paintings at the National Gallery of Art, Washington, DC
 John Constable: a complete chronology and other articles
 Constable's Oil Sketches Victoria and Albert Museum
 A Sketchbook by Constable Victoria and Albert Museum
 List of works held by the Victoria and Albert Museum
 390 paintings by John Constable at www.John-Constable.org
 Gallery of Constable Paintings at MuseumSyndicate
 Portraits by the artist as a young man: Constable's parents finally identified, The Guardian, March 4, 2009
Memoirs of the Life of John Constable, ed C. R. Leslie 1843
Romanticism & the school of nature : nineteenth-century drawings and paintings from the Karen B. Cohen collection, fully digitized text from The Metropolitan Museum of Art libraries
Charles Rhyne Archive - Research on John Constable

 
Burials at St John-at-Hampstead
English landscape painters
English romantic painters
English watercolourists
Artists from Brighton
People from East Bergholt
Royal Academicians
1776 births
1837 deaths
18th-century English painters
English male painters
19th-century English painters
People from Dedham, Essex
Rother Valley artists
18th-century English male artists